State elections were held in all states and territories in Malaysia except Sarawak on 5 May 2013, alongside general elections. Although the Pakatan Rakyat alliance received over 50% of the vote across the 12 states and territories where elections took place, the Barisan Nasional won the most seats, emerging as the largest faction in all states and territories except Kelantan, Penang and Selangor.

Results

Perlis

Kedah

Kelantan

Terengganu

Kuala Besut BN assemblyman, A. Rahman Mokhtar died on 26 June 2013, paving way for a by-election

Penang

Perak

Pahang

Selangor

Negeri Sembilan

Malacca

Johor

Sabah

References

state
State elections in Malaysia